Fiona Walker (born Isle of Wight 1969) is a British author of contemporary women's fiction. She has been popularly dubbed ‘the Jilly Cooper of the Cosmo generation’.

Biography 
Fiona Walker studied drama at the University of London before embarking upon a brief career in advertising. Her first novel, French Relations, was published when she was in her early twenties. She lives with her partner and their two daughters in rural Warwickshire.

Bibliography 
 French Relations (1994)
 Kiss Chase (1995)
 Well Groomed (1996)
 Snap Happy (1998)
 Lucy Talk (1999)
 Between Males (2001)
 Lots of Love (2003)
 Tongue in Cheek (2005)
 Four Play (2007)
 Love Hunt (2009)
 Kiss and Tell (2011)
 The Love Letter (2012)
 The Summer Wedding (2013)
 The Country Escape (2014)
 The Woman Who Fell in Love for a Week (2015)
 The Weekends of You and Me (2016)
 The Country Set (2017)
 Country Lovers (2019)
 Woman of a Certain Rage Written as Georgie Hall (2021)

References 
 
 Little Brown Group
Hodder and Stoughton Publishers Hodder and Stoughton
 Curtis Brown Literary Agency
 Fiona Walker biography 
 Vulpes Libris
 Fiona Walker Good Reads

External links 
 Fiona Walker official site

1969 births
Living people
British women novelists
20th-century British novelists
21st-century British novelists
20th-century British women writers
21st-century British women writers
People from the Isle of Wight
Alumni of the University of London